HMS Cassandra was an Adonis-class  schooner of the Royal Navy during the Napoleonic War. She was built at Bermuda using Bermudan cedar and completed in 1806.

Cassandra was commissioned in October 1806 under the command of Lieutenant George Le Blanc. She was ordered to carry dispatches to the squadron blockading Bordeaux, France. When she met up with the fifth rate frigate  on 13 August 1807, Le Blanc left Cassandra to take the dispatches to Naiad. Two sudden squalls rolled Cassandra over on her beam ends, capsizing her and causing her to sink stern first. Eleven men and one woman and her child drowned.

Citations and references
Citations

References

 
  

 

1806 ships
Ships built in Bermuda
Adonis-class schooners
Maritime incidents in 1807
Shipwrecks in the Bay of Biscay